Hadhramaut usually refers to a historical area in southern Arabia and modern-day Yemen.

It may also refer to:

 Hadhramaut Governorate, a governorate in Yemen
 Hadhramaut Plateau / Highlands
 Hadhramaut Mountains
 Hadhramaut Tribal Alliance